Michell Adalberto Rodríguez González (born 10 August 2000) is a Mexican professional footballer who plays as a midfielder for Liga de Expansión MX club Raya2, on loan from Monterrey.

References

External links

Michell Rodríguez at Official Liga MX Profile

2000 births
Living people
Mexican footballers
C.F. Monterrey players
Ascenso MX players
Liga Premier de México players
Association football midfielders
Footballers from Veracruz
People from Poza Rica